The mixed team skeet event at the 2019 European Games in Minsk, Belarus took place on 28 June at the Sporting Club.

Schedule
All times are FET (UTC+03:00)

Records

Results

Qualification
The qualification round took place on 28 June to determine the qualifiers for the finals.

Finals
The finals round took place on 28 June to determine the final classification.

References

Mixed team skeet